Koropets is an urban-type settlement in Chortkiv Raion (district) of Ternopil Oblast (province) in western Ukraine.  Koropets was first founded in 1421, and it acquired the status of an urban-type settlement in 1984. Koropets hosts the administration of Koropets settlement hromada, one of the hromadas of Ukraine. Population: 

Until 18 July 2020, Koropets belonged to Monastyryska Raion. The raion was abolished in July 2020 as part of the administrative reform of Ukraine, which reduced the number of raions of Ternopil Oblast to three. The area of Monastyryska Raion was merged into Chortkiv Raion.

The classical palace of Count Stanislav Badeni, built in the beginning of the 19th century, is located in the town of Koropets.

People from Koropets
 Bohdan Hawrylyshyn (1926–2016), economist and an economic advisor to the Ukrainian government.

References

External links
 

Urban-type settlements in Chortkiv Raion
Populated places established in the 1420s